Gosagaresvar Siva Temple is a Hindu temple dedicated to god Shiva located in the city of Bhubaneswar in Orissa, India. There are three Hindu shrines dedicated to Shiva within the walls of the temple complex.

History
The temple build in Ganga rule  14th-15th centuries A.D The temple has a single pidha vimana of Kalinagan order. It is a living temple and the presiding deity is a Sivalinga within a circular Yonipitha. The temple was repaired by Orissa State Archaeology under X and XI Finance Commission Award. Religious ceremonies like Sivaratri and Sankranti are observed here.

Architecture 
Structural System : Pidha vimana of impoverished Kalingan order
Building Techniques : Ashlar Dry masonry.
Material of Construction : Coarse grained sandstone

See also
 List of temples in Bhubaneswar

Notes

References

Hindu temples in Bhubaneswar
Shiva temples in Odisha
13th-century Hindu temples